The 1554 siege of Matsuo was one of many sieges undertaken by the daimyō Takeda Shingen in his campaign to conquer Japan's Shinano Province. This took place during Japan's Sengoku period, in which feudal lords (daimyōs) vied for control of fiefdoms across the country.

Matsuo castle, in the Ina valley, was controlled by Ogasawara Nobusada; after defeating him, Shingen went on to seize nearby Yoshioka castle as well.

References
Turnbull, Stephen (1998). The Samurai Sourcebook. London: Cassell & Co.

1554 in Japan
Matsuo
Matsuo
Conflicts in 1554